Akobir Turaev (born 3 November 1996) is an Uzbek professional footballer who plays as a forward for Kyrgyz Premier League club Neftchi.

Club career
Turaev began his football career with U21 side of FC Buxoro in 2012 before moving to the senior side of the club in 2013. He was later loaned out to Pakhtakor Tashkent in 2016. He also featured in Pakhtakor's 3–0 win against Al-Jazira in the AFC Champions League. After completing his loan spell with Pakhtakor, he returned to his parent club Buxoro the following season.

Turaev was a part of Buxoro until the end of 2018–19 season. During his time at the club, he scored three goals in 20 matches. In 2019, he set out for a new challenge abroad and joined Bangladeshi side Rahmatganj MFS. He scored two goals in 10 matches for the Bangladeshi outfit before returning back to Uzbekistan. He signed for FK Mash'al Mubarek in August 2020, but moved to Tajikistan in January 2021 for lack of game-time. He scored eight goals and provided an assist in 15 appearances for Eskhata Khujand in the Tajikistan Higher League, Tajikistan's top tier.

Akobir signed for TRAU on August 30, 2021, on a one-year deal in which the 2021–22 I-League began started from the last week of December. He scored his first goal for the club against Sreenidi Deccan on 3 March 2022.

Honours
Rahmatgonj MFS
Federation Cup runner-up: 2019
Pakhtakor Tashkent
Uzbekistan Super Cup runner-up: 2016

References

External links
Akobir Turaev at Flashscore

1996 births
Living people
TRAU FC players
Expatriate footballers in India
I-League players
Association football forwards
Association football players not categorized by nationality
Association football wingers